The  is a grand tourer manufactured by Lexus, Toyota's luxury division. Based on the 2012 LF-LC Concept, it was revealed at the 2016 North American International Auto Show in Detroit. It replaced the SC, which was produced from 1991 to 2010. It is the first Lexus model to utilize the GA-L platform, which, along with other components, is shared with the full-size XF50 series LS sedan. According to Lexus, the name "LC" stands for "Luxury Coupe".



History

Development 
The LC was developed under the program codename "950A" from 2011 to 2016. It was previewed by the LF-LC Concept, which was designed at Calty Design Research in Newport Beach, California. The concept vehicle was revealed at the 2012 Detroit Auto Show. Design work was later transferred from Calty to Toyota Technical Centre in Aichi, Japan in January 2013, with a final production design freeze in the first half of 2014.

Introduction 
Four years after the concept's debut, the production model, dubbed LC 500, was introduced in January 2016 at the same venue. It is paired with a 10-speed automatic transmission.

A hybrid-electric model, dubbed LC 500h, was revealed in Geneva in February 2016. It is powered by a 3.5-litre 8GR-FXS V6 engine, a hybrid transmission, and a lithium-ion battery pack with a combined  output at 6,600 rpm, and an estimated  of combined torque at 3000 rpm.

In February 2021, the Japanese publication Best Car reported that the LC F performance coupe is scheduled for release in November 2021 with a 4.0L twin-turbo V8 engine producing  and  torque, along with a double-wishbone suspension and 21-inch wheels.

Manufacturing 
The LC is built at Toyota's Motomachi facility, the same plant that produced the LFA. The factory was reconfigured for LC production, which included finishing the entire facility's interior in white. Many of the "Takumi" master craftsmen who built the LFA continue their work on different areas of the LC, including carbon fibre parts, leatherwork and paint. Series production commenced in March 2017, with the first example completed on April 23, 2017.

Concept cars 
The LC Convertible Concept is based on the LC. It has 22-inch wheels and white leather trim with gold accent stitching. Tadao Mori was the Chief Designer. It weighed more than the LC coupé, therefore the top speed and acceleration times dropped slightly.

Convertible 
The LC 500 Convertible, based on the concept car, was unveiled at the LA Auto Show on November 20, 2019. Its features include a transparent polycarbonate wind deflector, neck heaters, and Active Noise Control (ANC) technology.

Design 
The LC retained the overall design of the concept model. It has a variant of Lexus' corporate "spindle" grille with a gradient pattern; a tightly compressed mesh at the top transitions to a wider diamond at the bottom. However, unlike other vehicles in the lineup, the top of the spindle grille does not have a chrome surround. The compact LED triple-projector headlight is in the small overhang between the bumper and wheels.

Chassis 
The LC is the first vehicle to use Lexus' front-engine, rear-wheel drive platform, dubbed "Global Architecture – Luxury" (GA-L). It consists of various materials, including high-strength steel, aluminium, and carbon fibre. The GA-L platform would underpin future rear-wheel drive models, including the LS 500, which was introduced in January 2017. The platform is designed to provide lower overall mass, improved front/rear weight distribution, and a low center of gravity. Run-flat tires are also used to avoid the need for a spare, and the vehicle battery has been relocated to the trunk to improve weight distribution.

The suspension is a double-joint multi-link suspension with a forged aluminium upper arm is secured at two points, which ensures all movements are mirrored from the lower arm. The double-joint design reduces the necessary height of the suspension system, as placement is lower than a traditional single-joint setup.

Powertrain

LC 500 
The LC 500 is powered by a 2UR-GSE 5.0-litre V8 engine which is an updated version of the engine found in the RC F and GS F. It uses D-4S direct and port fuel injection, Atkinson cycle operation and VVT-i.

Lexus claimed that the LC 500 can hit  in 3 seconds.

LC 500h 
The LC 500h employs a hybrid powertrain, known as the Lexus Multi Stage Hybrid system.

The engine and motors are coupled to a unique transmission, which consists of a four-speed automatic transmission embedded inside a continuously variable transmission. This “dual” transmission provides stepped access to the torque generated by the electric motor, and functions similarly to a 10-speed automatic transmission.

Motorsport

Super GT

GT500 
The LC500 GT500 is a GT500 GT race car derived from the road-going LC500 for use in the Super GT from 2017 onwards. The car is the direct replacement to the Lexus RC F GT500, which competed in the 2014 to 2016 Super GT seasons. The LC500 GT500 car made its début at the 2017 Okayama GT 300km, and claimed 14 race wins of the 24 overall entered races from 2017 until 2019 (26 with the Super GT/DTM crossover events). In 2020, with the introduction of the new Class One and the revival of the Supra nameplate, the Toyota GR Supra would take its place in the GT500 category.

GT300 
For 2023, a GT300 version of the LC500h, called the LC500h GT, was developed by APR as a replacement for their Toyota Prius GT300. The car features the same hybrid system as the Prius before it.

Marketing 
For Marvel Studios' Black Panther Lexus provided LC500's for filming in South Korea during the car chase sequence. Lexus also produced two specific LC Models named "Black Panther Editions" with a large Black Panther mask decal on the hood, blue underbody lighting, 24-inch wheels and  blue paint with subtle striping.

Sales 

European statistics include sales from the following countries: Austria, Belgium, Bulgaria, Cyprus, Czech Republic, Denmark, Estonia, Finland, France, Germany, Great Britain, Greece, Hungary, Iceland, Ireland, Italy, Latvia, Lithuania, Luxembourg, Netherlands, Norway, Poland, Portugal, Romania, Slovakia, Slovenia, Spain, Sweden, and Switzerland.

References

External links 
 

LC
Cars introduced in 2017
2020s cars
Grand tourers
Personal luxury cars
2+2 coupés
Convertibles
Rear-wheel-drive vehicles
Hybrid electric cars
Partial zero-emissions vehicles
Vehicles with four-wheel steering